Horim Museum is a museum in Seoul, South Korea.

The museum was founded by Yun Jang-seob (윤장섭 尹章燮) who after setting up the Sungbo Cultural Foundation (성보문화재단 成保文化財團) in July 1981 to purchase antiquities, established the Horim Museum in October 1982 at Daechi-dong, Gangnam-gu by leasing one floor of a building. In May 1999 it relocated to Sillim-dong, Gwanak-gu with four main exhibition galleries — the Archaeology Gallery, the Ceramics Gallery, the Metal Art Gallery and the Painting and Book Gallery — and a special gallery and souvenir shop and rooms in total covering about 4,600 square metres.

The museum owns more than 10,000 pieces of Korean art including more than 3,000 earthenwares, 2,100 porcelains, 1,100 celadons, 500 buncheongs, 2,000 paintings, 400 pieces of metal arts amongst many other items.

See also
List of museums in Seoul
List of museums in South Korea

References

External links
Official site  
 Horim Museum at Google Cultural Institute

Gwanak District
Art museums and galleries in Seoul
1982 establishments in South Korea
Art museums established in 1982